Frederick Newman (7 November 1909 – 28 March 1977) was an Australian cricketer. He played two first-class matches for Western Australia between 1935/36 and 1936/37.

References

External links
 

1909 births
1977 deaths
Australian cricketers
Western Australia cricketers
Cricketers from Perth, Western Australia